The 4th Magritte Awards ceremony, presented by the Académie André Delvaux, honored the best films of 2013 in Belgium and took place on 1 February 2014, at the Square in the historic site of Mont des Arts, Brussels beginning at 8:00 p.m. CET. During the ceremony, the Académie André Delvaux presented Magritte Awards in 21 categories. The ceremony was televised in Belgium by BeTV. Actress Émilie Dequenne presided the ceremony, while actor Fabrizio Rongione hosted the show for the second time.

The nominees for the 4th Magritte Awards were announced on 9 January 2014. Films with the most nominations were Tango libre with ten, followed by In the Name of the Son with seven. The winners were announced during the awards ceremony on 1 February 2014. Ernest & Celestine won three awards, including Best Film and Best Director for Stéphane Aubier and Vincent Patar. Other multiple winners were Blue Is the Warmest Colour and Tango libre with two awards each.

Winners and nominees

Best Film
 Ernest & Celestine (Ernest et Célestine)
 In the Name of the Son (Au nom du fils)
 Kinshasa Kids
 Tango libre
 The World Belongs to Us (Le Monde nous appartient)

Best Director
 Stéphane Aubier and Vincent Patar – Ernest & Celestine (Ernest et Célestine)
 Frédéric Fonteyne – Tango libre
 Sam Garbarski – Vijay and I
 Vincent Lannoo – In the Name of the Son (Au nom du fils)

Best Flemish Film in Coproduction
 Kid
 Brasserie Romantiek
 The Fifth Season (La Cinquième Saison)

Best Foreign Film in Coproduction
 Blue Is the Warmest Colour (La Vie d'Adèle – Chapitres 1 & 2)
 Horses of God (Les Chevaux de Dieu)
 The Nun (La Religieuse)
 Populaire

Best Screenplay
 Tango libre – Philippe Blasband and Anne Paulicevich Kid – Fien Troch
 The Fifth Season (La Cinquième Saison) – Peter Brosens and Jessica Woodworth
 Vijay and I – Philippe Blasband and Sam Garbarski

Best Actor
 Benoît Poelvoorde – A Place on Earth (Une place sur la Terre)
 François Damiens – Tango libre
 Jan Hammenecker – Tango libre
 Sam Louwyck – The Fifth Season (La Cinquième Saison)

Best Actress
 Pauline Étienne – The Nun (La Religieuse)
 Lubna Azabal – Goodbye Morocco
 Déborah François – Populaire
 Astrid Whettnall – In the Name of the Son (Au nom du fils)

Best Supporting Actor
 Laurent Capelluto –  (Le Temps de l'aventure)
 Olivier Gourmet – Grand Central
 Bouli Lanners – 11.6
 David Murgia – I Am a Standard Supporter (Je suis supporter du Standard)
 Renaud Rutten – A Song for My Mother (Une chanson pour ma mère)

Best Supporting Actress
 Catherine Salée – Blue Is the Warmest Colour (La Vie d'Adèle – Chapitres 1 & 2)
 Dominique Baeyens – In the Name of the Son (Au nom du fils)
 Christelle Cornil – Landes
 Nicole Shirer – BXL/USA

Most Promising Actor
 Achille Ridolfi – In the Name of the Son (Au nom du fils)
 Mehdi Dehbi – The Bag of Flour (Le Sac de farine)
 Steve Driesen – Landes
 Bent Simons – Kid

Most Promising Actress
 Pauline Burlet – The Past (Le Passé)
 Rania Mellouli – The Bag of Flour (Le Sac de farine)
 Anne Paulicevich – Tango libre
 Mona Walravens – Blue Is the Warmest Colour (La Vie d'Adèle – Chapitres 1 & 2)

Best Cinematography
 Horses of God (Les Chevaux de Dieu) – Hichame Alaouié Mood Indigo (L'Écume des jours) – Christophe Beaucarne
 Tango libre – Virginie Saint-Martin

Best Sound
 Ernest & Celestine (Ernest et Célestine) – Frédéric Demolder, Emmanuel de Boissieu, Luc Thomas, and Franco Piscopo In the Name of the Son (Au nom du fils) – Philippe Charbonnel, Guilhem Donzel, and Matthieu Michaux
 Tango libre – Marc Bastien and Thomas Gauder

Best Production Design
 Tango libre – Véronique Sacrez Mood Indigo (L'Écume des jours) – Pierre Renson
 The Fifth Season (La Cinquième Saison) – Igor Gabriel

Best Costume Design
 Vijay and I – Catherine Marchand A Place on Earth (Une place sur la Terre) – Elise Ancion
 A Song for My Mother (Une chanson pour ma mère) – Nathalie Deceuninck and Aliette Vliers

Best Original Score
 The World Belongs to Us (Le Monde nous appartient) – Ozark Henry The Bag of Flour (Le Sac de farine) – Christophe Vervoort
 In the Name of the Son (Au nom du fils) – Michelino Bisceglia

Best Editing
 Kinshasa Kids – Marie-Hélène Dozo Tango libre – Ewin Ryckaert
 Vijay and I – Sandrine Deegen

Best Short Film
 Welkom
 Bowling Killers
 Le Conseiller
 Partouze

Best Documentary Film
 La Nuit qu'on suppose
 Amsterdam Stories USA
 L'irrésisitible ascension de Moïse Katumbi
 The Sound of Belgium

Best First Feature
 A Song for My Mother (Une chanson pour ma mère)

Honorary Magritte Award
 Emir Kusturica

Films with multiple nominations and awards

The following seventeen films received multiple nominations.

Ten: Tango libre
Seven: In the Name of the Son
Four: The Fifth Season, Vijay and I
Three: The Bag of Flour, Blue Is the Warmest Colour, Ernest & Celestine, Kid, A Song for My Mother
Two: Horses of God, Kinshasa Kids, Landes, Mood Indigo, The Nun, A Place on Earth, Populaire, The World Belongs to Us

The following three films received multiple awards.
 Three: Ernest & Celestine
 Two: Blue Is the Warmest Colour and Tango libre

See also

 39th César Awards
 19th Lumières Awards
 2013 in film

References

External links
 
 
 4th Magritte Awards at AlloCiné

2014
2013 film awards
2014 in Belgium